The SK postcode area, also known as the Stockport postcode area, is a group of nineteen postcode districts in England, within eleven post towns. These cover south-east Greater Manchester (including Stockport, Cheadle, Hyde, Stalybridge and Dukinfield), parts of east Cheshire (including Macclesfield, Wilmslow and Alderley Edge), north-west Derbyshire (including Buxton, High Peak and Glossop) and a small part of north Staffordshire.



Coverage
The approximate coverage of the postcode districts:

|-
! SK1
| STOCKPORT
| Stockport
| Stockport
|-
! SK2
| STOCKPORT
| Stockport, Offerton
| Stockport
|-
! SK3
| STOCKPORT
| Stockport, Davenport, Edgeley, Adswood, Bridgehall
| Stockport
|-
! SK4
| STOCKPORT
| Stockport, Four Heatons, Heaton Moor
| Stockport
|-
! SK5
| STOCKPORT
| Stockport, Brinnington, Reddish
| Stockport
|-
! SK6
| STOCKPORT
| Bredbury, Romiley, Woodley, Marple, Marple Bridge, High Lane
| Stockport
|-
! SK7
| STOCKPORT
| Bramhall, Hazel Grove, Woodford
| Stockport
|-
! SK8
| CHEADLE
| Cheadle, Cheadle Hulme, Gatley, Heald Green
| Stockport
|-
! rowspan="2"|SK9
| WILMSLOW
| Wilmslow, Handforth, Styal
| rowspan="2"|Cheshire East
|-
| ALDERLEY EDGE
| Alderley Edge
|-
! SK10
| MACCLESFIELD
| Macclesfield (north), Bollington, Pott Shrigley, Prestbury, Rainow
| Cheshire East
|-
! SK11
| MACCLESFIELD
| Macclesfield (south), Sutton, Rushton Spencer
| Cheshire East, Staffordshire Moorlands
|-
! SK12
| STOCKPORT
| Disley, Poynton
| Cheshire East
|-
! SK13
| GLOSSOP
| Glossop, Hadfield
| High Peak
|-
! SK14
| HYDE
| Hyde, Broadbottom, Gee Cross, Hollingworth, Mottram in Longdendale
| Tameside
|-
! SK15
| STALYBRIDGE
| Stalybridge, Carrbrook, Heyrod, Matley, Millbrook
| Tameside
|-
! SK16
| DUKINFIELD
| Dukinfield
| Tameside
|-
! SK17
| BUXTON
| Buxton, Tideswell, Hartington, Longnor, Chelmorton
| High Peak, Derbyshire Dales, Staffordshire Moorlands
|-
! SK22
| HIGH PEAK
| Birch Vale, Hayfield, Little Hayfield, New Mills, Rowarth
| High Peak
|-
! SK23
| HIGH PEAK
| Buxworth, Chapel-en-le-Frith, Chinley, Combs, Furness Vale, Kettleshulme, Whaley Bridge
| Cheshire East, High Peak
|}

The SK22 and SK23 districts and the  post town were formed in 1996, out of the SK12 district and the  post town.

Map

See also
Postcode Address File
List of postcode areas in the United Kingdom

References

External links
Royal Mail's Postcode Address File
A quick introduction to Royal Mail's Postcode Address File (PAF)

Metropolitan Borough of Stockport
Tameside
Cheshire
Derbyshire
Postcode areas covering North West England
Postcode areas covering the East Midlands